The Fury of Our Maker's Hand is the second studio album by American heavy metal band DevilDriver, released on June 28, 2005. It's the first DevilDriver album to feature guitarist Mike Spreitzer. The album entered the Billboard charts at number 117, with sales of 10,402. A special edition of the album was released on October 31, 2006. It contained six bonus tracks and an additional DVD with the band's four music videos.

A music video was produced for the song "Hold Back the Day", which found airplay on MTV2's Headbangers Ball. It featured stylistic elements, primarily background visuals such as a female mannequin head, highly reminiscent of Black Sabbath's video for "Paranoid".

The song "Driving Down the Darkness" was featured in the fifteenth episode of the sixth season of Scrubs.

Notes 
 "Unlucky 13" and "Guilty as Sin" were tracks recorded during the sessions for The Fury of Our Maker's Hand.
 "Digging Up the Corpses" is an outtake from their self-titled DevilDriver album. The song had only been previously released on the Resident Evil: Apocalypse movie soundtrack.
 The three live tracks (mixed by Andy Sneap) were recorded on tour in support of The Fury of Our Maker's Hand.

Track listing

Charts

References

External links
 
 The Fury of Our Maker's Hand at DevilDriver's official website
 The Fury of Our Maker's Hand at Roadrunner Records
 The Fury of Our Maker's Hand (Special Edition) at DevilDriver's official website

2005 albums
DevilDriver albums
Roadrunner Records albums
Albums produced by Colin Richardson
Albums recorded at Sonic Ranch